Drybeck is a hamlet in the Eden district in the English county of Cumbria. It is near the  town of Appleby-in-Westmorland. It is on Dry Beck and has a hall called Drybeck Hall, there is also a Moor called Drybeck Moor. Circa 1870, it had a population of 87 as recorded in the Imperial Gazetteer of England and Wales.

References 

 Philip's Street Atlas Cumbria (page 103)

Hamlets in Cumbria
Eden District